Alexander Goodman More  (5 September 1830 – 22 March 1895) was a British naturalist.

Life
Born in London, More was educated at Rugby School, and matriculated at Trinity College, Cambridge in 1850. He did not graduate, however, though he remained at Trinity until 1855: periods of illness interrupted his studies. He did make contact with a number of botanists and ornithologists there. He occupied himself with natural history. 

In 1866, in conjunction with David Moore, he published "an excellent account on the geographical distribution of plants in Ireland," titled Contributions towards a Cybele Hibernica.

From 1867 to 1887 he was Curator of the Natural History Museum of the Royal Dublin Society.

In 1887 he was elected a Fellow of the Royal Society of Edinburgh. His proposers were Alexander Dickson, Ramsay Heatley Traquair, Robert Gray and Alexander Buchan.

Publications

 Cybele Hibernica (1866), with David Moore.
 On the Distribution of Birds in Great Britain (1865)

References 

1830 births
1895 deaths
British naturalists
Fellows of the Royal Society of Edinburgh
Fellows of the Linnean Society of London
Members of the Royal Irish Academy
Irish botanists